Budak is a village in the Gümüşhane province.

Geography 
It is 38 km from Gümüşhane province and 18 km from Torul district. The surrounding villages are Silve, Köstere, Köprübaşı, Langas, Haşilya, Koryana.

Population

References 

Villages in Gümüşhane Province